Munno Para West is a northern suburb of Adelaide, South Australia. It is within the City of Playford.

Munno Para west is bounded by Max Fatchen Expressway on the west, Curtis Road to the south, Stebonheath Road to the east and a line parallel to Fradd Road but north of the Almond Grove housing estate to the north. The boundaries were adjusted in June 2011 to ensure that the new expressway did not divide the suburb.

References

Suburbs of Adelaide